Street Language is the fourth studio album by American country music artist Rodney Crowell. It was released in 1986 (see 1986 in country music) by Columbia Records, his first release on that label. It peaked at #38 on the Top Country Albums chart. The songs, "Let Freedom Ring", "When I'm Free Again", "She Loves the Jerk" and "Looking for You" were released as singles but they all failed to chart within the top 20. This album was co-produced by R & B artist Booker T. Jones and features a blend of soul and country music.

In 1984, Crowell recorded what was to be a new album for Warner Bros., Street Language.  That album, a pop-sounding effort co–produced by David Malloy, was rejected by Warner Bros, and was never released.  The label requested a more Nashville-friendly record, but Crowell negotiated a release from his contract and moved to Columbia Records.  He then he brought in Booker T. Jones as co-producer and re-recorded a more rock and roll/electric-sounding Street Language in 1986.

The song "Looking for You" was co-written with Crowell's then wife, Rosanne Cash. "She Loves the Jerk" was written and first recorded by John Hiatt in 1983 and was included on his album, Riding with the King. It would later be covered by Elvis Costello.

Crowell's version of "I Don't Have to Crawl" was recorded for the Warner Bros. release, but did not make it onto the final Columbia album.  That track was released in 1989 on the Rodney Crowell Collection.

Track listing

Personnel
Mike Baird -  drums
Eddie Bayers - drums
Richard Bennett - acoustic guitar
Ben Cauley - horn
Bobby Clark - mandolin
Anthony Crawford - background vocals
Quitman Dennis - horn
Hank DeVito - steel guitar
Rick DiFonzo - guitar
Anton Fig - drums
Vince Gill - acoustic guitar, background vocals
Bob Glaub - bass guitar
Kenny Greenberg - electric guitar
Jim Horn - horn, saxophone
Wayne Jackson - horn
Eric Johnson - guitar
Booker T. Jones - organ, synthesizer, piano, background vocals
Mary Ann Kennedy - background vocals
David Lindley - guitar
Dave Loggins - background vocals
Randy McCormick - synthesizer
Joann Neal - background vocals
Dean Parks - guitar
Mike Porter - percussion
Michael Rhodes - upright bass, bass guitar
Robert Sabino - synthesizer
Ralph Schuckett - keyboards
Steuart Smith - electric guitar
Keith Sykes - background vocals
Billy Joe Walker Jr. - electric guitar
Roger "Rock" Williams - horn
Peter Wood - organ, programming
Pete Wosner - background vocals

Choir performed by 'Catch a Rising Choir' and brass ensemble is 'Uptown Horns'

Chart performance

Album

Singles

Sources

1986 albums
Rodney Crowell albums
Columbia Records albums
Albums produced by Rodney Crowell
Albums produced by Booker T. Jones